New Chicago, also known as West Chicago (as it was originally named) is a ghost town and unincorporated community in Granite County, Montana, United States, on the west bank of Flint Creek. It is located 2.85 miles (1.77 km) south of Drummond on a gravel trail off the Pintler Veterans Memorial Scenic Highway, better known as Montana Highway 1. New Chicago formerly had amenities, consisting of two hotels, two stores, a flour mill, a telegraph station, a Wells Fargo office, and a Post Office. The rest of the area is now inhabited by fair-sized ranches. The community is served by the post offices in Hall and Drummond.

Resources 

 New Chicago on Google Maps

References

Unincorporated communities in Granite County, Montana